Nakhla may refer to:

Places 
 Nakhla, Algeria
 Nakhla Dam in northern Morocco
 Nakhla (Saudi Arabia), an area located in Saudi Arabia
 Abu Nakhla

Other uses 
 Nakhla (name), a family name, mainly lives in Syria, Lebanon, Palestine and Egypt
 Nakhla meteorite, a Mars meteorite that landed in the Nakhla region of Abu Hommos, Alexandria, Egypt
 Nakhla raid, the first successful caravan raid against the Meccans